Cypridopsis is a genus of ostracods, belonging to the family Cyprididae.

The genus was described in 1867 by George Stewardson Brady.

The genus has cosmopolitan distribution.

Species include:
 Cypridopsis bamberi Henderson, 1986
 Cypridopsis elephantiasis Hu & Tao, 2008
 Cypridopsis sinensis Hu & Tao, 2008

References

Cyprididae